Mathew Randall Ishbia (born January 6, 1980) is an American billionaire who is CEO and chairman of mortgage lender United Wholesale Mortgage. He  was finalized as majority owner of the Phoenix Suns of the National Basketball Association and Phoenix Mercury of the Women's National Basketball Association alongside his older brother Justin on February 6, 2023.

Biography
Ishbia was raised in a Jewish family in Birmingham, Michigan, a suburb of Detroit. He played basketball as a walk-on point guard for Michigan State from 1999 to 2002 and was a member of the team that won the national championship in 2000. In 2013, he succeeded his father as the CEO of United Wholesale Mortgage (founded by his father in 1986). In January 2021, he took the company public which made him a billionaire. He also controversially announced in 2021 that UWM would no longer work with any broker or bank that also worked with Rocket Mortgage or the Fairway Independent Mortgage Group, both of whom are UWM's rivals in the mortgage industry. This led to him having a rivalry with Dan Gilbert and Rocket Mortgage, with Gilbert being the only NBA owner to abstain from voting to approve Ishbia's ownership of the Phoenix Suns in February 2023.

Forbes lists his net worth as of April 2022 at $4.9 billion USD.

In December 2022, Ishbia's bid was accepted by suspended team owner Robert Sarver to purchase the NBA's Phoenix Suns and WNBA's Phoenix Mercury basketball teams for $4 billion, pending league approval. At 43, he became the NBA's youngest team owner in the league's history, with the NBA nearly-unanimously approving of the sale on February 6, 2023, before it became official on February 7, 2023. During his first few days of ownership (before the end of the 2023 NBA trade deadline), the Suns were able to trade for superstar forward Kevin Durant and reacquire T.J. Warren from the Brooklyn Nets in exchange for Mikal Bridges, Cameron Johnson, Jae Crowder, four unprotected first round picks, and a 2028 first round pick swap.

Philanthropy 
On February 4, 2021, Ishbia donated $32 million to Michigan State University, the largest one-time commitment from a single person. A month later, on March 12, Ishbia donated $1 million to the V Foundation for Cancer Research.

References

External links 
Inside new Suns owner Mat Ishbia’s drive to direct ‘an elite NBA franchise’ in Phoenix

American billionaires
21st-century American businesspeople
Living people
Michigan State Spartans men's basketball players
National Basketball Association owners
Phoenix Mercury owners
Phoenix Suns owners
Point guards
American people of Jewish descent
1980 births